KUNV (91.5 FM) is a non-commercial, jazz-oriented campus radio station in Paradise, Nevada, broadcasting from Greenspun Hall on the campus of University of Nevada, Las Vegas (UNLV).

In November 2011, KUNV HD-2 launched The Morning Rebellion Show, a student-run morning show designed to offer training on how to assemble and execute a professional morning show. Industry professional Lynn Briggs was the initial mentor of the ongoing program.

In March 2012, KUNV officially became known as 91.5 The Source, a name change intended to reflect that the station is the community's source for diverse programming unavailable on commercial radio. The station also became a Billboard reporter, making it one of very few public radio stations to ever hold that honor. During the same month the station also dropped its NPR affiliation and added PRI programming to its lineup, including the nationally syndicated "The Takeaway" program.

In January 2014, KUNV discontinued its PRI programming and shifted focus to locally produced programming. A few syndicated programs are obtained through PRX which air in the evenings.

In July 2014, KUNV was nominated by the National Association of Broadcasters for the inaugural Marconi award for Noncommercial Station of the Year. The other nominees were KCPW, WEAA, WRHU, and WSDP.

In May, 2015, student programming made a return to the main station with a format reflecting what is done on the HD-2 station. Student programming runs from 9p-3a and includes independent rock, underground hip hop, and electronic music on weekdays and eclectic programming on the weekends.

See also
 List of jazz radio stations in the United States

References

External links
 Official website

1981 establishments in Nevada
UNV
Jazz radio stations in the United States
NPR member stations
Radio stations established in 1981
UNV
University of Nevada, Las Vegas